The Expotrade Arena or Expotrade Convention and Exhibition Center is an indoor arena and convention center located in Pinhais, metropolitan area of Curitiba, Brazil, with a capacity of up to 20,000 for concerts and 10,000 for exhibitions.

List of concerts 
The arena was set to substitute the venue concert Pedreira Paulo Leminski that was closed in late 2008 until 2014, when Pedreira was re-opened. 

 Oasis: May 10, 2009 - Dig Out Your Soul Tour
 Scorpions: September 21, 2010 - Get Your Sting and Blackout World Tour
 Iron Maiden: April 5, 2011 - The Final Frontier World Tour
 Maroon 5: August 24, 2012 - Overexposed Tour

External links
Official website 

Indoor arenas in Brazil
Buildings and structures in Paraná (state)